Monika Kaźmierczak is currently the city carillonist of Gdańsk, Poland. She has been the city carillonist since 2001. She was the president of the Polish Carillon Association between 2011 and 2015, and, is the secretary of the association.

Education 
She began her musical studies on piano, then earning a Master's degree studying music theory at the Music Academy in Gdańsk. After becoming city carillonist, she studied at the Netherlands Carillon School, and received a master's degree in 2005. Finally she received a doctorate in Carillon from the Music Academy in Gdańsk in 2012.

Professional 
Kaźmierczak plays throughout many countries in Europe, including Lithuania, France, and the Netherlands. She has worked with the Hevelius Brass Quintett, and also plays a mobile carillon. She currently teaches carillon at the Music Academy in Gdańsk, and other subjects at the Elblag State Music School.

References 

Living people
20th-century women musicians
20th-century classical musicians
Carillonneurs
Polish keyboardists
Utrecht School of the Arts alumni
21st-century women musicians
Year of birth missing (living people)
20th-century Polish musicians
21st-century classical musicians
21st-century Polish musicians
Musicians from Gdańsk